Galactic Conquest is the second full-length album by the Christian pop punk band Eleventyseven.  The album was released on September 4, 2007, through Flicker Records.

In December, 2017, ten years after release, a limited edition vinyl pressing and release of Galactic Conquest occurred.

Critical reception
The album received a wide variety of reviews ranging from positive to very negative.

New Release Tuesday praised the album saying "Overall, a must-have for anybody looking for original Christian music. The style is great and Eleventyseven have really found their niche. I mean, nobody else does it, and they do it perfectly. I would love to see the style throughout their next album, but this is one of my favorites for the year."  Kevan Breitinger of CCMCentral optimistically stated "The punk pop genre has been known, let’s face it, to lend itself to sophomoric behavior, repetitive beats, and a notable lack of imagination. But Eleventyseven’s sophomore release, Galactic Conquest, is decidedly un-sophomoric....Eleventyseven wrings as much out of it as anyone else in the mix, often a bit more. Galactic Conquest goes a long way in bringing soul to the genre."

On the flipside, Scott Fryberger of Jesus Freak Hideout said, "It's kind of sad nowadays that artists will put out music without much effort, knowing that there are kids out there who will buy it. I guess Eleventyseven is an amazing alternative to the filth and garbage that kids are listening to in the mainstream, like Soulja Boy or Nickelback, so I must give them props for that. And if it's what kids like, then Eleventyseven is doing a good job of keeping them entertained. But for those of us wanting some pop/punk with depth and maturity, steer clear of this, and go with FM Static or Run Kid Run. You'll most likely be more satisfied with them." 
Finally, Andy Argyrakis of Today's Christian Music negatively stated, "The group's sugar-coated sounds and watered-down lyrics lack the full-fledged punch needed to fully land on any level....And while the project has a few more glimpses of saccharine satisfaction (thanks in part to producer Ian Eskelin of All Star United fame), Eleventyseven still has plenty of room to develop before a Galactic Conquest is even remotely possible."

Singles
The song "Love In Your Arms" was released as the band's first single for this record, making it as high as the No. 6 spot in ChristianRock.Net's weekly Top 30. The second song "It's Beautiful" also hit the Top 15, charting at No. 13 on the October 6, 2007 R&R chart.

Track listing

Personnel 

Eleventyseven
Matt Langston - lead vocals, guitar, co-producer on track 11
Caleb Satterfield - bass
Johnathan Stephens - drums
Additional production
Ian Eskelin - producer
Travis Wyrick - producer (on Japanese edition bonus track 13 & 14 only)
Will McGinniss - executive producer
Mark Stuart - executive producer
Mike Payne - additional guitar on track 3, acoustic guitar on track 6
Tim Lauer - keyboards and string arrangement on track 6
Aaron Shannon - recording, additional programming, mixing on track 11
Ben Phillips - drums recording
Barry Weeks - vocal engineering, additional vocal production
JR McNeely - mixing
Steve Blackmon - mixing assistant
Dan Shike - mastering
Heather Hetzler - A&R production
Josh Heiner - art direction, styling
Tim Parker - design, art direction
Dave Hill - photography
 Love Sponge Strings
 Kris Wilkinson
 David Davidson
 David Angell
 Anthony Lamarchina Galactic Choir (on track 4)
 Matt Payne
 Mike Payne
 Matty McRee
 Marty Wheeler
 Troy Vest
 Zach Morris

Chart performance

Music videos
 (opening intro to the video contains the song "Happiness" in the background)

Notes
The song "Conan" is a tribute to late-night talk show host, Conan O'Brien.  Within the first line of the song, Max Weinberg is also mentioned.
"Program Terminated" (the final track on the basic album track listing) has a hidden track, after a short silence, entitled "The Starship Unicorn". The song was released later as a separate track on the iTunes version of the album.
The Japanese edition of the album also comes with the music videos to the band's songs "Myspace" and "Love In Your Arms".
In the music video for "Love in Your Arms", the band Flatfoot 56 cameo as the bullies that beat up the band at the beginning and end of the video.

References

2007 albums
Eleventyseven albums
Flicker Records albums